Attitude is the thirteenth studio album by the Canadian rock band April Wine, released in October 1993 (see 1993 in music). It was the band's first album since their break-up in the 1980s. The boy on the front cover of the album is Myles Goodwyn's son.

Track listing 
All tracks written by Myles Goodwyn unless otherwise noted.
 "Givin it, Takin it" – 4:10
 "Good From Far, Far From Good" – 3:38
 "If You Believe in Me" (S. Gray, T. Kennedy) – 4:17
 "That's Love" – 3:55
 "It Hurts" – 3:56
 "Hour of Need" – 2:41
 "Here's Looking at You Kid" – 4:08
 "Strange Kind of Love" – 4:03
 "Can't Take Another Nite" (B. Greenway, Jeff Nystrom) – 4:05
 "Luv Your Stuff" – 3:05
 "Emotional Dreams" – 4:11
 "Voice in My Heart" (S. Gray, T. Kennedy) – 4:02
 "Girl in My Dreams" – 4:18

Personnel 
 Myles Goodwyn – vocals, guitars, keyboards
 Brian Greenway – vocals, guitars, harmonica
 Steve Segal – guitars
 Jim Clench – bass, background vocals
 Jerry Mercer – drums

Additional keyboards by: Jean St. Jacques and George Lagios

References 

April Wine albums
1993 albums
MCA Records albums
Albums produced by Myles Goodwyn